The Church of San Miguel (Spanish: Iglesia de San Miguel) is a Catholic church located in Cogolludo, Spain. It was declared Bien de Interés Cultural in 1991.

References 

Buildings and structures in the Province of Guadalajara
Roman Catholic churches in Castilla–La Mancha
Bien de Interés Cultural landmarks in the Province of Guadalajara
Churches in the Province of Guadalajara